Valley View Local School District is a school district in Montgomery County, Ohio, serving German Township which contains Germantown, Ohio. In addition, it serves the majority of Jackson Township, including Farmersville, Ohio.

The district was formed in 1968, as the result of the consolidation of Germantown High School and Farmersville High School. The resulting district adopted the Spartan name, of which the first class graduated in 1968 from the old Germantown High School. The first class to graduate from the new 
high school was 1969.

Board of education
The Board of Education consists of five members, elected by the general public. Terms last four years.

Current Members:
Tim Rudd,
Stephanie Smith,
Ben DeGroat,
Bob Skidmore,
and Spencer Izor

Schools
The district was formed in 1968 and reconfigured in 2011. 
Valley View High School is located at 6027 Farmersville Pk., Germantown, Oh. 45327; 
Valley View Junior High School is located in the village of Farmersville (7 & 8 grades) at 202 Jackson St, Farmersville, Oh 45325; 
Valley View Intermediate (4 through 6 grades) are located at 64 Comstock St. Germantown, Oh 45327; 
Valley View Primary School (grades K - 3) is located at 110  Comstock St. Germantown, Oh 45327

References

External links
 Official website

Education in Montgomery County, Ohio
School districts in Ohio
School districts established in 1968
1968 establishments in Ohio